Claudia de Breij (born 13 March 1975) is a Dutch comedian, singer, show host and radio disk jockey.

In 2010, she won the Dutch Poelifinario prize for best cabaret program.

Notes

1975 births
LGBT cabaret performers
Living people
Mass media people from Utrecht (city)
Dutch DJs
Dutch women comedians
Dutch women television presenters
Dutch cabaret performers
Dutch LGBT singers
21st-century Dutch LGBT people